The  is a Japanese theatre company based in Tokyo, Japan. Along with the Mingei Theatre Company and Bungakuza it is considered one of the "Big Three" among Shingeki theatre troupes.

Former Members 
Eijirō Tōno
Koreya Senda
Eitaro Ozawa
Tatsuya Nakadai
Mikijirō Hira
Gō Katō
Ichirō Nakatani
Kin Sugai
Kunie Tanaka
Hisashi Igawa
Yoshio Harada
Atsuo Nakamura
Etsuko Ichihara

From Haiyuza Theatre Company Kenkyujo (School)

References

External links

Theatre companies in Japan
1954 establishments in Japan